Shohola Falls is a 2003 novel written by Michael Pearson. The novel imagines the true story of Thomas Blankenship, the young man that Mark Twain reputedly based the character of Huck Finn upon in his novel Adventures of Huckleberry Finn. In Shohola Falls, Mark Twain is set as an important character, the fictional reality aligned to the historical one.

Michael Pearson (born 1949) is the author of five books—besides Shohola Falls, he has written four works of nonfiction -- Imagined Places: Journeys into Literary America(a NY Times Notable Book of 1991), A Place That's Known: Essays (1994), John McPhee (1997), and Dreaming of Columbus: A Boyhood in the Bronx (1999).

For a decade – from 1997-2006 – he directed the MFA Program in Creative Writing at Old Dominion University in Norfolk, Virginia.  Now, he teaches nonfiction writing and American literature there.

2003 American novels
American historical novels